The Bârsa is a left tributary of the river Someș in Romania. It discharges into the Someș in Someș-Odorhei.

References

Rivers of Romania
Rivers of Sălaj County